The Sussex Bears are an English basketball club, based in the town of Lancing, West Sussex.

History
The Bears were formed in 2014. Former Worthing Thunder coach and local basketball legend Gary Smith was brought in to lead the club as chairman and first team coach, and with him he brought a number of former Thunder players to form the nucleus of the new team. 

The Bears' name is not a new one to basketball in the area - the Brighton Bears played in the top-flight BBL for many years until their final season in 2006. 

The 'new' club has since developed rapidly, increasing the number of men's, women's and youth teams representing under the Bears' name. The Bears have also risen through the divisions of the English Basketball League, reaching their current position in Division 2 in 2017.

Honours
Men's National Shield: 2016-17 
Men's National Development League South: 2015-16

Teams
For the 2019-20 season, the Bears will field the following teams: 

Senior Men - National League Division 2 South
U18 Boys - National League U18 Premier South
U16 Boys - National League U16 Premier South
U14 Boys - National League U14 Premier South
U14 Girls - National League U14 Regional

U16 Boys II - National League U16 Conference South
U14 Boys II - National League U14 Conference South
U12 Mixed - National League U12 Regional
Senior Men II - Local League
Senior Women - Local League

U16 Boys III - Local League
U14 Boys III - Local League
U12 - Local League
U11 - Local League
Wheelchair - division 2 south National league
Wheelchair - division 3 south east National league
Wheelchair - division 4

Home Venue
The Bears are based at the Sir Robert Woodard Academy in Lancing.

Season-by-season records

References

Basketball teams in England
Sport in West Sussex
Basketball teams established in 2014
2014 establishments in England